Robert William Brown (born April 10, 1968) is a Canadian former professional ice hockey right winger. 

He is best known for his time spent playing for the Pittsburgh Penguins from his debut in 1987 until 1990, and then again from 1997 until 2000. Between and following these stints, Brown shuffled between minor league teams in the International Hockey League (IHL) and other NHL teams, including the Hartford Whalers, Chicago Blackhawks, Dallas Stars, and Los Angeles Kings.

Playing career
As a youth, he played in the 1981 Quebec International Pee-Wee Hockey Tournament with a minor ice hockey team from Oshawa.

Brown was a prolific scorer at the junior level, averaging over two points per game during his junior career. In particular, Brown flourished in 1986-87 winning multiple awards including Most Valuable Player (West), Top Scorer (West), and the inaugural WHL Plus-Minus Award. Brown also set the current Western Hockey League records for both assists and points with 136 and 212 respectively. He was also named CHL Player of the Year for the 1986-87 season. Brown won a gold medal as a member of Team Canada at the 1988 World Junior Ice Hockey Championships.

Brown was drafted 67th overall by the Pittsburgh Penguins in the 1986 NHL Entry Draft. His best statistical NHL season was the 1988–89 season, when he played on a line with Mario Lemieux; placing fifth in league scoring, he set career highs with 49 goals, 66 assists, 115 points, 24 power play goals, 6 game-winning goals, and a +27 plus/minus rating. He was also the starting right winger for the 40th National Hockey League All-Star Game. The next season, he scored at a point per game average, registering 80 points in 80 games. Brown was traded on December 21, 1990 to the Hartford Whalers for Scott Young. In parts of two seasons, Brown had 73 points in 86 games for the Whalers before being traded on January 24, 1992 to the Chicago Blackhawks in exchange for Steve Konroyd. Brown finished the 1991-92 season playing 25 games for Chicago registering 16 points. In 1992-93, Brown split time with the Chicago Blackhawks and their minor league team the Indianapolis Ice. During the next few years, Brown would sign contracts with the Dallas Stars and Los Angeles Kings, but mostly played in the IHL. Brown led the IHL in scoring for three years and was awarded the James Gatschene Memorial Trophy for league MVP in 1993-94. His scoring production at the IHL level did not go unnoticed and on October 1, 1997 Brown returned to the Pittsburgh Penguins by signing a contract as a free agent. Brown played the next three seasons there; playing a total of 190 games while contributing 87 points. Brown then returned to the minors, ending his career with the Chicago Wolves of the AHL in 2003.

Brown served as a colour commentator for the Edmonton Oilers pay-per-view, and currently as an analyst on 630 CHED for Edmonton Oilers games. He also became a hockey instructor with the St. Albert Sports Academy, St. Francis Xavier Hockey Academy, and NAX Hockey Academy.

Personal life 
Brown was born in Kingston, Ontario, but grew up in St. Albert, Alberta.

Career statistics

Regular season and playoffs

International

Awards
Bob Brownridge Memorial Trophy (WHL leading scorer) - 1986
 WHL West First All-Star Team – 1986 & 1987

See also
List of NHL players with 100-point seasons

References

External links

Down Goes Brown

1968 births
Canadian ice hockey right wingers
Canadian people of British descent
Chicago Blackhawks players
Chicago Wolves players
Dallas Stars players
Hartford Whalers players
Ice hockey people from Ontario
Sportspeople from St. Albert, Alberta
St. Albert Saints players
Kamloops Blazers players
Kamloops Junior Oilers players
Kalamazoo Wings (1974–2000) players
Living people
Los Angeles Kings players
National Hockey League All-Stars
Phoenix Roadrunners (IHL) players
Pittsburgh Penguins draft picks
Pittsburgh Penguins players
Sportspeople from Kingston, Ontario
Ice hockey people from Alberta